Adolf Fischer (18 November 1900 – 21 October 1984) was a German actor. He appeared in more than sixty films from 1931 to 1977.

Selected filmography

References

External links 

1900 births
1984 deaths
German male film actors